The 1996 BMW Open was a men's tennis tournament played on outdoor clay courts in Munich in Germany and was part of the World Series of the 1996 ATP Tour. The tournament ran from 29 April through 5 May 1996. Unseeded Ctislav Doseděl won the singles title.

Finals

Singles

 Ctislav Doseděl defeated  Carlos Moyá 6–4, 4–6, 6–3
 It was Doseděl's 1st title of the year and the 2nd of his career.

Doubles

 Lan Bale /  Stephen Noteboom defeated  Olivier Delaître /  Diego Nargiso 4–6, 7–6, 6–4
 It was Bale's only title of the year and the 4th of his career. It was Noteboom's only title of the year and the 2nd of his career.

References

External links
 Official website 
 Official website 
 ATP tournament profile

 
BMW Open
Bavarian International Tennis Championships